Loabi Vaanama is a 2005 Maldivian television series directed by Mohamed Shareef and distributed by Television Maldives. The series focuses on the lives of four colleagues, played by Sheela Najeeb, Mohamed Manik, Fathimath Noora and Ahmed Saeed.

Cast

Main
 Sheela Najeeb as Nisha
 Mohamed Manik as Sameer
 Fathimath Noora as Aminath Rifa
 Ahmed Saeed as Yasir

Recurring
 Arifa Ibrahim as Habeeba; Nisha's mother
 Ahmed Asim as Ibrahim Umar
 Ali Waheed as Hamid
 Shaifa Ibrahim as Shara
 Hassan Manik as Faseeh
 Sheereen Abdul Wahid as Rameeza
 Aminath Wafiyya as Jameela Easa
 Mariyam Zuhura as Thahu
 Ahmed Hassan as Abeer

Guest
 Hussain Nooradeen as Waheed
 Zeenath Abbas as Niuma
 Abdulla Faisal as Ibrahim's colleague (Episode 5)
 Abdulla Munaz (Episode 5)

Episodes

Soundtrack

Reception
The first episode of the series was met with lukewarm response from the audience due to the different "visualization style" of the director and the scene arrangement by screenwriter. However, from the second episode onwards, the series picked up and become a success among the critics and audience.

References

External links 
 

Serial drama television series
Maldivian television shows